The Stout Skycar was a series of four one-off American light aircraft of the 1930s.

Development
William Bushnell Stout was a prolific designer of road vehicles and aircraft, including the Ford Trimotor series. He was founder of the Stout Metal Airplane Division of the Ford Motor Company and in 1931 designed the Skycar which was specified for easy handling and provided with automobile-style comfort. Single examples of four variations on the basic design were produced between 1931 and 1944.

The Skycar I was first displayed at the spring 1931 Detroit Show. The aircraft was a two-seat high-wing monoplane, accommodating the occupants in tandem layout. It had an all-metal steel-tube frame covered with corrugated metal skin. Centre-line nose and tail-wheels plus a standard landing gear were fitted. The rear fuselage was constructed from an open framework carrying a single fin and rudder, inside which was located the rear pusher engine. The Sky Car was displayed with a Moorhouse engine (Alfred Moorhouse of Detroit, assignor to Packard Motor Car Company). Fuel was carried in two tanks in the leading portion of the central section of the engine housing, from where it was fed by gravity to the engine. At a later date the aircraft was fitted with twin booms carrying the single fin and rudder (see photo of preserved aircraft). The aircraft featured balanced pivoting outboard wingtips rather than ailerons. Stout attempted to design a simple aircraft that would have controls similar to early model Fords including the ignition switch and the starter button. Stout planned to build the Sky Car (i.e. its original name was "Sky Car" but various newspaper and magazine articles spelled it "Skycar")  and sell it at the price of a moderately priced car (approximately $2000) if mass-produced in numbers.

The Skycar II of 1941 was a higher-powered version utilising stainless steel construction and twin tail booms. The four-wheel landing gear was intended to facilitate a later rebuild to roadability which never occurred. It was built with support from Fred Fisher of General Motors.

The Skycar III of 1943 had a higher-powered Lycoming engine to enable operation at higher gross weight, but was otherwise similar to the Skycar II.

The Skycar IV of 1944 was also known as the Spratt-Stout Model 8 and the Convair 103. It was similar to the Skycar III with twin tail-booms, but fitted with twin fins and rudders.

Operational history

The Skycar I, sometimes referred to as the Model 11-W. It was flown as a personal aircraft by Stout for several years  and was later donated to the Smithsonian Institution. It is on display in the National Air and Space Museum at Dulles Airport Virginia.

The Skycar II was evaluated by the United States Army Air Forces (USAAF) as the XC-65 light transport. It was destroyed in a hangar fire circa 1942.

The Skycar III was tested by the USAAF as the XC-107.

Variants

Data from:-Aerofiles: Stout
Skycar I  Michigan Rover R-267 pusher engine, later  Warner Junior. (1 built)
Skycar II  Franklin O-200 pusher engine. Gross weight 1550 lbs. (1 built)
Skycar III  Lycoming O-290 pusher engine. Gross weight 1825 lbs. (1 built)
Skycar IV  Franklin 4ACG pusher engine, later  Lycoming O-290C. (1 built)

Weick W1 Fred Weick of NACA, with permission, built his own aircraft based roughly on the Skycar for safety and control tests. The tested features were later applied to his ERCO Ercoupe design.

Specifications (Skycar I)

References

Notes

Bibliography

External links

  Aerofiles data and photos of the Skycars

1930s United States civil utility aircraft
High-wing aircraft
Twin-boom aircraft
Single-engined pusher aircraft
Aircraft first flown in 1931